Montagne de Reims Regional Natural Park (French: Parc naturel régional de la Montagne de Reims) is a protected area in the Grand Est region of France. It is organized around the Montagne de Reims, a wooded range of hills covered by vineyards that produce the region's eponymous sparkling wine, Champagne.

Member communes
As of 2012, the following communes are park members: 
 
 Ambonnay
 Aubilly
 Avenay-Val-d'Or
 Baslieux-sous-Chatillon
 Belval-sous-Chatillon
 Bisseuil
 Bligny
 Bouilly
 Bouleuse
 Bouzy
 Chambrecy
 Chamery
 Champillon
 Châtillon-sur-Marne
 Chaumuzy
 Chigny-les-Roses
 Cormoyeux
 Coulommes-la-Montagne
 Courmas
 Courtagnon
 Cuchery
 Cuisles
 Cumieres
 Damery
 Dizy
 Ecueil
 Fleury-la-Riviere
 Fontaine-sur-Ay
 Germaine
 Hautvillers
 Jonquery
 Jouy-les-Reims
 La Neuville-aux-Larris
 Louvois
 Ludes
 Mailly-Champagne
 Mareuil-sur-Ay
 Marfaux
 Méry-Prémecy
 Mutigny
 Nanteuil-la-Foret
 Pargny-les-Reims
 Poilly
 Pourcy
 Reuil
 Rilly-la-Montagne
 Romery
 Sacy
 Saint-Euphraise-et-Clairizet
 Saint-Imoges
 Sarcy
 Sermiers
 Tauxieres-Mutry
 Tours-sur-Marne
 Trépail
 Vandières
 Venteuil
 Verzenay
 Verzy
 Ville-en-Selve
 Ville-en-Tardenois
 Villers-Allerand
 Villers-Marmery
 Villers-sous-Châtillon
 Vrigny

See also
 List of regional natural parks of France

References

Regional natural parks of France
Geography of Marne (department)
Protected areas established in 1976
Tourist attractions in Marne (department)
1976 establishments in France